Michel Chalhoub (9 October 1931 – 30 July 2021) was a French billionaire of Syrian origin, and founder of the Chalhoub Group. As of August 2021, his net worth was estimated at US$1.1 billion.

Early life 
Michel Chalhoub was born in Damascus, Syria, in 1931.

Career 
Michel and Widad Chalhoub started their business in Damascus in 1955. After the successful military coup of Syria and the economic uncertainty, they were compelled to move to Beirut. A decade later, due to the Lebanese Civil War, they relocated to Kuwait where the company flourished and their sons, Anthony and Patrick, joined the Group

In 1990 was the Invasion of Kuwait followed by the Gulf War, they were forced to establish an exile operation in order to keep the company going.

They ended up controlling about 20% of the region's market in luxury goods.

Personal life 
Michel Chalhoub was married to Widad, and they lived in Dubai.

Their two sons, Anthony and Patrick, took over as co-CEOs of Chalhoub Group in 2001. Since Anthony’s death in 2018, Patrick is the sole CEO.

Death 
Michel Chalhoub died on 30 July 2021, aged 89. He is survived by his wife Widad and one son, Patrick.

References

1931 births
2021 deaths
French billionaires
French businesspeople
French people of Syrian descent
People from Damascus
French company founders